Cheirodontops geayi is a species of characin endemic to Venezuela where it is found in the Orinoco River basin. It is the only member of its genus. This species can be found in a freshwater environment within a benthopelagic range. They are native to tropical climates. The average length of an unsexed male is about 4 cm (1.5 in).

References

Notes
 

Characidae
Monotypic ray-finned fish genera
Fish of South America
Fish described in 1944